Simone Bitton (born 1955) is a French-Moroccan documentary filmmaker.  Her films have been nominated for or won the César Award, the Marseille Festival of Documentary Film Award, and the Sundance Film Festival, Special Jury Prize (for Mur).

Personal life
Bitton was born the daughter of a Jewish jeweller in Morocco. She describes herself as a Mizrahi Jew. After settling in France, where she now mainly lives she graduated from the Institut des hautes études cinématographiques in 1981.

Filmography 
 1981 : Solange Giraud, née Tache
 1997 : Palestine/israel, histoire d’une terre
 1998 : Ben Barka, l’équation marocaine
 1998 : Mahmoud Darwich
 2000 : L'Attentat
 2001 : Citizen Bishara
 2004 : Wall (Mur)
 2009 : Rachel

References

External links
 
 
 
 IMDb
 Filmfestivals.com
 Fidmarseille.org

Moroccan film directors
20th-century Moroccan Jews
Mizrahi Jews
French people of Moroccan-Jewish descent
Moroccan emigrants to France
French women film directors
Israeli women film directors
French film directors
1955 births
Living people